The 2006 Qantas Television Awards were announced on 22 November 2006 in a ceremony at the Aotea Centre in Auckland. The ceremony was hosted by television presenters Dominic Bowden and Petra Bagust. Awards were presented in news and current affairs and general television categories, as well as four awards selected by public vote.

Winners

The winners of the 2006 Qantas Television Awards were announced on 22 November 2006.

News and Current Affairs

Best News
 One News (TV One)

Best News or Current Affairs Presenter
John Campbell, Campbell Live (TV3)

Best News Reporter
Donna-Marie Lever, One News "Unrest Returns to Dili" (TV One)

Best Current Affairs Reporter
Hadyn Jones,  20/20 "Peddling in the Park" (TV2)

Best News Report (team Award)
 3 News, "Gaza" (TV3)

Best Current Affairs Report (team award)
 20/20 "Detox Diary" (TV2)

Best Current Affairs Series
 Campbell Live "Telecom"	(TV3)

Best News Camera
Leon Menzies, 3 News "Poorest & Urban Girls" (TV3)

Best Current Affairs Camera
Peter Day, Sunday "The Big Chill" (TV One)

Best News/Current Affairs Editing
Shahir Daud, One News "Press Photo"	(TV One)
 Close Up "Steam Train" (TV One)

General Television

Best Actor in a TV Drama
Ryan O’Kane, The Insiders Guide to Love (TV2)

Best Actress in a TV Drama
Kate Elliott, The Insiders Guide to Love (TV2)

Best NZ Drama
 The Insiders Guide to Love (TV2)

Best Script (non-factual)
David Brechin-Smith,	The Insiders Guide to Love (TV2)

Best Director (drama)
Brendan Donovan, The Insiders Guide to Love	(TV2)

Best Camera (non-factual)
Simon Baumfield, The Insiders Guide to Love (TV2)

Best Editing (non-factual)
Bryan Shaw Doves of War (TV3)

Best NZ Arts/ Festival Documentary
 Artsville "The Magical World of Misery" (TV One)

Cure Kids Best NZ Children’s/ Youth Programme
 Let's Get Inventin'  "Rocket Skates" (TV2)

Best NZ Comedy
 Pulp Sport series 3, episode 1 (TV3)

Best NZ Entertainment
 Dave Dobbyn: One Night in Matata (TV One)

Best NZ Information/ Lifestyle
 Target "Special: Ep 1: Australia" (TV3)

Best NZ Popular Documentary
 Million Dollar Tumor (TV3)

Best NZ Reality (format)
 Sensing Murder (TV2)

Best NZ Sports or Event Coverage
 Na Ratou Mo Tatou ANZAC Day Special	(Māori Television)

Best NZ Observational Reality (non format)
 Snotties (TV2)

Best Director (non-drama)
Geoff Husson, Sensing Murder "The Patient Killer" (TV2)

Best Editing (factual)
Paul Sutorius, Aspiring (TV One)

Best Camera (factual)
David Stipsen, Airports and Overtures(TV One)

TV Journalist of the Year
Mike McRoberts, 3 News (TV3)

Woman’s Day Readers’ Choice Awards 2006

Favourite New Zealand Female Personality
Hilary Barry

Favourite New Zealand Male Personality
Simon Dallow

Favourite New Zealand Show
Shortland Street

Favourite International Show
Grey's Anatomy

References

Qantas
New Zealand television awards
Qantas Television Awards
Awards
2000s in New Zealand cinema